The white-bellied pygmy tyrant (Myiornis albiventris) is a species of bird in the family Tyrannidae. It is found in Bolivia and Peru. Its natural habitat is subtropical or tropical moist lowland forests.

References

Myiornis
Birds described in 1894
Taxa named by Jan Sztolcman
Taxonomy articles created by Polbot